This is a list of Chess boxing champions at each weight class sanctioned by World Chess Boxing Organisation (WCBO) and World Chessboxing Association (WCBA).

Heavyweight

WCBA World

WCBO World (Amateur)

WCBO World

European

UK

Light heavyweight

World

Middleweight

World

USA

Lightweight

See also

Chess boxing
World Chessboxing Association
World Chess Boxing Organization

References

Chess boxing